Vestervig is a village in Vestervig Parish in Denmark, located in Thisted municipality in North Denmark Region (until December 31, 2006; Sydthy municipality, Viborg County). Vestervig has a population of 591 (1 January 2022). It has a disproportionately large church, Vestervig Abbey, which served as a cathedral until 1130 when the see was transferred to Børglum.

This article is based on material from the Danish Wikipedia; articles Vestervig and Vestervig Kirke, accessed on February 10, 2007.

Climate

Notable people 
 Theodgar of Vestervig (died in or about 1065) a missionary from Thuringia who worked mostly in Jutland  where he died and is venerated as a saint
 Peter von Scholten (1784 in Vestervig – 1854), Governor-General of the Danish West Indies
 Per Pedersen (born 1964 in Vestervig) a retired road bicycle racer from 1986 to 1993

References

Vestervig
Thisted Municipality